The Palace is a residential high-rise building located in the Brickell neighborhood of Miami, Florida, United States. The building's is located at 1541 Brickell Avenue. The Palace houses 42 floors, and was completed in 1981. The building was designed by the renowned Arquitectonica architectural firm, and MEP engineering services were provided by Franyie Engineers, Inc. (franyie.com).

See also
List of tallest buildings in Miami

External links 
The Palace on Emporis 
The Palace on SkyscraperPage

Palace (Miami)
Palace
1981 establishments in Florida
Arquitectonica buildings